Regulator of G-protein signaling 10 is a protein that in humans is encoded by the RGS10 gene.

Function 

Regulator of G protein signaling (RGS) family members are regulatory molecules that act as GTPase activating proteins (GAPs) for G alpha subunits of heterotrimeric G proteins. RGS proteins are able to deactivate G protein subunits of the Gi alpha, Go alpha and Gq alpha subtypes. They drive G proteins into their inactive GDP-bound forms. Regulator of G protein signaling 10 belongs to this family. All RGS proteins share a conserved 120-amino acid sequence termed the RGS domain. This protein associates specifically with the activated forms of the two related G-protein subunits, G-alphai3 and G-alphaz but fails to interact with the structurally and functionally distinct G-alpha subunits. Regulator of G protein signaling 10 protein is localized in the nucleus. Two transcript variants encoding different isoforms have been found for this gene.

Interactions 

RGS10 has been shown to interact with SAP18 and GNAI3.

References

Further reading